daliel's may refer to:

daliel's Bookstore, bookstore and publishing venture in mid-20th Century, Berkeley, California founded by George Leite
daliel's Gallery, art gallery and performance space, at the same time period and location